Room at the Top is a 2012 BBC television adaptation by Amanda Coe of John Braine's 1957 novel of the same name, with a cast led by Matthew McNulty, Maxine Peake and Jenna Coleman, and directed by Aisling Walsh.

Summary 
Based on John Braine's classic novel about a young man on the make in 1940's Yorkshire. Joe Lampton moves to the wealthy town of Warley. 

It's not long before he has attracted the attentions of Susan Brown, a very pretty girl with a rich and successful father. But Joe is already in love with another woman. Older than him and with her looks beginning to fade, Alice Aisgill is married already.

Production 
It aired in two parts on 26 and 27 September 2012 on BBC Four, but was originally due to premiere on 7 April 2011. A statement at the time said that delay was due to "a potential contractual issue", and it later emerged that another film company challenged the sale of the television rights to Great Meadow Productions, which produced the film for BBC. It won a BAFTA Award for Best Miniseries in 2013.

References

External links
  Retrieved 2012-09-27
 BBC Four: Room at the Top Retrieved 2012-09-27

2012 British television series debuts
2012 British television series endings
2010s British television miniseries